The Saxon Steed (Low Saxon: Witte Peerd) is a heraldic motif associated with the German provinces of Lower Saxony and Westphalia, and the Dutch region of Twente.

Origin and past uses
The horse as a heraldic charge associated with Saxony first appears in the late 14th century, at which time it was described as an "old Saxon" motif.
For this reason, there has been a long history of antiquarian speculation identifying the motif as a tribal symbol of the ancient Saxons.

A tradition first recorded in 1492 reports that the 8th-century Saxon ruler Widukind displayed a black horse as his field sign.

Historian James Lloyd suggests that ‘the Saxon Steed motif was invented in the 14 century …. as a faux ancient symbol for the Saxons’, being derived from an account by Gobelinus of the myth of Hengist and Horsa in Britain.

The horse motif was adopted by the House of Welf, whose original symbol was a golden lion on red ground. 
It has also been used in several provinces in Westphalia (therefore, it is also called Westfalenross, meaning "Westphalian steed", or Welfenross, meaning "Welf steed"). After this, it became the heraldic animal of the Kingdom of Hanover (since 1866 the Prussian Province of Hanover), of the Prussian Province of Westphalia and since 1922 of the Free State of Brunswick. This tradition continues in two modern federal States of Germany: Lower Saxony and North Rhine-Westphalia.

Modern uses

The coat of arms of the German state of Lower Saxony
shows a white Saxon steed (Sachsenross) on a red background.

The steed became the coat of arms of the Province of Hanover as a province of the Kingdom of Prussia in 1866 after it had been in use for the Duchy of Brunswick and the Kingdom of Hanover since 1814. It appears on some of their 19th Century coins and postage stamps. It was even in use after the abolition of German monarchy after World War I until 1935, when state flags were prohibited by the Nazis and only the flag of Nazi Germany was to be used.

Coat of arms of Lower Saxony

After World War II, the Province of Hanover became an independent state on 23 August 1946, and used the steed as its coat of arms again. Brunswick, which was also an independent state, had made the same decision some weeks before, on 8 July 1946. When these two states, along with Oldenburg and Schaumburg-Lippe, were merged into the new state of Lower Saxony, the Saxon steed became the unofficial coat of arms of the new state, and later the official one.

Coat of arms of North Rhine-Westphalia

The Saxon steed is also shown in one of the three sections of the coat of arms of North Rhine-Westphalia, particularly associated with the area of Westphalia.

British royal arms

In 1714 the House of Hanover became united in personal union with the United Kingdom. As a result, the Saxon Steed is found in the British royal arms during the Hanoverian period.

Official sign of Dutch Twente region

To express the Saxon heritage of the Twente region, local language and culture enthusiast J.J. van Deinse designed a common flag in the 1920s. The region borders on both the German states of Lower Saxony and North-Rhine-Westphalia. The local language, Tweants, is commonly classified as an extension of the Westphalian branch of the Low Saxon language. Within the Netherlands, it is known to be one of the more traditional (or conservative) varieties of the language.

Due to growing interests and pride in local culture, the Saxon steed has become a popular image. It can be found in varying formats and appearances, as well as to various degrees of stylisation in the likes of local football club FC Twente's logo, the local branch (Twents) of a Dutch public transport provider, and a growing range of other instances.

United States
The King George County, Virginia adopted the shield of 1714 British royal arms, thus the Saxon Steed is found in the seal of King George County.

References

See also
Coat of arms of Prussia
Coat of arms of Germany
Origin of the coats of arms of German federal states.
White horse of Kent

Old Saxony
Culture of Saxony
Lower Saxony
North Rhine-Westphalia
German coats of arms
Heraldic beasts
Horses in mythology